Valerianella locusta, called mâche or mache; common cornsalad; or lamb's lettuce, is a small, herbaceous, annual flowering plant in the honeysuckle family Caprifoliaceae. It is native to Europe, western Asia and north Africa, where it is eaten as a leaf vegetable.

Description
Cornsalad grows in a low rosette with spatulate leaves up to 15.2 cm long. It is a hardy plant that grows to zone 5, and in mild climates it is grown as a winter green.

In warm conditions it tends to bolt to seed, producing much-branched stems with clusters (cymes) of flowers. At the base of the corolla  is a whorl of bracts. Fertilized flowers produce achenes with two sterile chambers and one fertile chamber.

Distribution and habitat
Cornsalad grows wild in parts of Europe, northern Africa and western Asia. In Europe and Asia it is a common weed in cultivated land and waste spaces. In North America it has escaped cultivation and become naturalized on both the eastern and western seaboards.

As a cultivated crop, it is a specialty of the region around Nantes, France, which is the primary producer of mâche in Europe.

History
Cornsalad was originally foraged by European peasants. Jean-Baptiste de La Quintinie, royal gardener of King Louis XIV, introduced it to kitchen gardening. It has been eaten in Britain for centuries and appears in John Gerard's Herbal of 1597. It was grown commercially in London from the late 18th or early 19th century and appeared on markets as a winter vegetable, but it only became available in modern supermarkets there in the 1980s. American president Thomas Jefferson cultivated mâche at his home, Monticello, in Virginia in the early 1800s.

Common names
Common names include lamb's lettuce, common cornsalad, or simply cornsalad, mâche, fetticus, feldsalat, nut lettuce, field salad and valerian salad. The common name 'cornsalad' refers to the fact that it often grows as a weed in cornfields ('corn' is used in the sense of 'cereal', not the US meaning of maize).

In German-speaking Switzerland it is known as Nüsslisalat or Nüssler, terms that have been borrowed by the area's many English speakers. In some areas of Germany it is known as rapunzel, and is the origin of the long-haired maiden's name in the eponymous fairy tale, but see Campanula rapunculus. In restaurants that feature French cuisine, it may be called doucette or raiponce, as an alternative to mâche, by which it is best known. In Balkan region it is known as matilovac.

Nutrition
Cornsalad has a characteristic nutty flavour, dark green colour, and soft texture, and is popularly served as salad greens.

Like other formerly foraged greens, cornsalad has many nutrients, including three times as much vitamin C as lettuce, beta-carotene, B6, iron, and potassium. It is best if gathered before flowers appear.

References

Sources

locusta
Leaf vegetables